Malus fusca, with the common names Oregon crabapple and Pacific crabapple, is a species of crabapple native to western North America.

Description

The flowers are white or pale pink, blooming in spring. They may stay on the tree until winter.

The trees can reach at least 100 years of age.

Taxonomy

Archibald Menzies described the species in 1792 after finding it near today's Port Angeles, Washington.

Distribution and habitat
The species can be found from Alaska, through British Columbia, to northwestern California. It grows in temperate coniferous forest, primarily in the Cascade Range and the Pacific Coast Ranges.

The tree can grow in a variety of maritime conditions, its rootstock tolerating wet soils (including saltwater estuaries), poorly drained areas and heavy clay soils. It can be found in high-rainfall regions.

Ecology
It can be found growing along with red alder, bigleaf maple, willows, and cascara. Animals including grouse and bears eat the fruit.

Uses
The oblong fruit can be eaten, but has a sour flavor. The fruit can also be used for extraction of pectin, useful in helping make jams and jellies from other fruits, and is also made into jams and jellies itself. The bark can be used as an herbal medicine. It is also grown in parks and gardens as an ornamental plant.

Pacific crabapple fruits were prized by indigenous peoples of the Pacific Northwest as a food source, and were gathered all along the coast. As a traditional medicinal plant, infusions of the bark and/or fruit were used, including for stomach disorders, skin and eye infections, and as an analgesic.

The tree was also valued for its tough, resilient wood, used for making implements, and for its bark, used for a wide range of medicinal purposes.

References

External links 

CalFlora Database: Malus fusca (Oregon crab apple,  Oregon crabapple)
Dreamstime, Royalty Free Stock Images: Photos of the Pacific Crabapple tree (Malus Fusca)
UC Calphoto Photos gallery — Malus fusca

fusca
fusca
Flora of Alaska
Flora of British Columbia
Flora of California
Flora of Oregon
Flora of Washington (state)
Medicinal plants of North America
Plants used in Native American cuisine
Plants used in traditional Native American medicine
Plants described in 1830